Augustin Eduard (born 1 August 1962) is a Romanian former professional footballer and currently a manager. As a player, he was signed by FC Argeș in 1976 and grew up in the squad of Leonte Ianovschi, making his debut for the first team of "the White-Violet Eagles" in 1980. Eduard was in that first season part of a squad where Nicolae Dobrin, one of the most important Romanian players ever and a legend of FC Argeș, was the unquestioned leader. In two periods spent at FC Argeș, he played in over 170 matches and then was also part of the Steaua București squad that would go on to win the 1985–86 European Cup, but left the club in summer 1985, after having won a national championship title. In the early 1990s Eduard also played for Steaua's bitter rival Dinamo București and ended his career as a footballer at Gloria Bistrița in 1993.

Honours

Club
 Steaua București
Divizia A: Winner 1984–85
Cupa României: Winner 1984–85

International
 Romania
 FIFA World Youth Championship: Third place 1981

References

External links
 
 

1962 births
Living people
Sportspeople from Târgoviște
Romanian footballers
Romania youth international footballers
Romania international footballers
Association football defenders
Liga I players
FC Argeș Pitești players
FC Steaua București players
FC Dinamo București players
ACF Gloria Bistrița players
Romanian football managers
FC Argeș Pitești managers